Orbost is a historic early settlers town in the Shire of East Gippsland, Victoria,  east of Melbourne and  south of Canberra where the Princes Highway crosses the Snowy River. Orbost is the service centre for the primary industries of beef, dairy cattle and sawmilling. 
More recently, tourism has become an important and thriving industry, being the major town close to several national parks that are between the east access to either the surf or the snow, including the famous Snowy River National Park, Alpine National Park, Errinundra National Park, Croajingolong National Park and Cape Conran Coastal Park.

The establishment of the Sailors Grave Brewery has also brought significant tourism to the area with its multiple festivals throughout the year. Cycling and canoeing have also become major tourist attractions drawing people worldwide to the area for its wide range of cycling tours and spectacular rivers throughout the region.

History

Peter Imlay established the Snowy River Station for grazing in 1842, and his brother the Newmerella run nearby.  In 1845 the land was sold to Norman McLeod, who named the area after Orbost farm in the northwest of Isle of Skye, in Scotland.

Gold was discovered in the mid-1850s in the Bendoc area, in the mountains north of Orbost, which brought an influx of people to the district. By 1868 it was estimated that there was a population of 500 miners and squatters in the vicinity of Bendoc. 

The Cameron family settled on the rich alluvial river flats in 1876, followed by many other selectors, many of them Scottish migrants. Allan Burn opened the Post Office on 1 December 1880 named Neumerella (sic) and was renamed Orbost in 1883. He and wife Joyce (nee Morgan) had nine children. They owned 237 acres on the Snowy River (now Burn Rd). Allan and his brother Robert Burn arrived in Australia in 1850. Robert's descendants still live in Orbost today. A Newmerella office opened in 1889 and closed in 1897, then reopened in 1921.
The township was proclaimed in 1890 and a bridge constructed across the Snowy River and a telegraph office established. Sawmills were established in the area and the first batch of sawn timber was cut at Orbost in 1882. By the late 1890s produce was regularly being exported to Melbourne via coastal trading vessels sailing up the Snowy River to Orbost. The railway from Melbourne arrived in 1916, allowing further agricultural settlement up the valley, and exploitation of native hardwood forests for timber and railway sleepers.
 The Gippsland railway line and surrounding townships have embarked on a campaign to "Save the Snowy River Rail Bridge."

For most of the 20th century, Orbost was a fairly prosperous local centre for the forestry and agricultural industries and a supply point for smaller towns in the area. In the 1950s and 1960s several new sawmills were opened to exploit the native forests north and east of Orbost. By the 1980s, logging of East Gippsland native forests had become an environmental issue. This resulted in the creation or extension of National Parks in the area, and a steady decline in forestry and sawmilling jobs. The general rural decline of the area and its economy saw the railway close in the mid-1980s and the population drop from around 4,000 to around 2000 by the start of the 21st century. Logging and forestry continues to be a contentious issue in 2004 and 2005 in the Goolengook Valley, near the Errinundra National Park.

The Snowy Mountains Scheme resulted in the waters of the Snowy River being diverted to the Murray and Murrumbidgee Rivers and associated irrigation schemes. During the 1990s the low level of water in the Snowy River was a major concern, with a political campaign to increase the flow of water from the dam at Jindabyne. Independent candidate from the Orbost district, Craig Ingram, was elected in 1999, and re-elected in 2002, to the Victorian Legislative Assembly.

The small rural communities of Bendoc, Bonang and Tubbut lie North East of Orbost. Delegate in NSW is the next major town geographically across the NSW/Vic Border from Orbost.

Sports
The town is represented in the sport of Australian rules football by the Orbost-Snowy Rovers in the East Gippsland Football League.

The town's cricket teams have been successful at all levels in the Bairnsdale Cricket Association, ranging from U13s to A Grade. The U16s cricket team appeared in the Grand Final for four consecutive years, from 2017-2021, winning both 2020 and 2021.

The town also boasts a field hockey club which fields junior, women's and men's sides in the East Gippsland Hockey Association.

Golfers play at the course of the Orbost Golf Club on the Bonang Highway.

Transport

Orbost straddles the Princes Highway. A 567 metre bridge over the Orbost floodplain opened in November 1976. The town was connected to Melbourne when the Gippsland railway line opened to Orbost station in 1916 principally carrying timber and farming produce. In the early days of the railway's operation dedicated passenger trains ran but these ceased by the 1930s. The line closed in 1987 when the line was cut back to Bairnsdale. The track infrastructure was dismantled in 1993/94. The line traversed a mixture of farmland, hills and heavily forested country. It included numerous bridges, including the Stoney Creek Trestle Bridge, the largest of its kind in Victoria. Public transport services are provided to the town by V/Line with road coach services from Batemans Bay, Marlo and Canberra to Bairnsdale that connect with train services to Melbourne.

Orbost has a regional airport, Orbost Airport YORB (RBS).

Climate
Orbost has an oceanic climate with warm summers and mild winters. June is the wettest month and January is the driest. The town features 73 clear days annually, much more than Melbourne's 48 days.

Current profile
The national parks are showcased in events such as The Wilderness Bike Ride, a community event managed out of Orbost, which won the Best Event 2004 Regional Tourism Award for East Gippsland.

Education
The Orbost region has four State primary schools, one Catholic primary school, and Orbost Secondary College (Government).

Notable people

 Percival Bazeley, scientist
 Jennings Carmichael (aka Grace Jennings Carmichael), poet
 Richard Dalla-Riva, politician
 Harry Firth, Australian motorsport legend. Winner of first Bathurst race in 1963.
 Jennifer Hansen, TV presenter 
 Sarah Hanson-Young, politician
 Nick Heyne, former Australian rules footballer with the St Kilda Football Club
 Craig Ingram, politician
 Charlie Lynn, politician
 Tim Matthews, Paralympic athlete
 Laura Jean McKay, author
 Molly Meldrum, music critic, journalist, TV presenter
 Peter Nixon, politician
 Lindsay Tanner, politician
 Brett Voss, Former Australian Rules Footballer St Kilda Football Club
 Michael Voss, former Australian rules footballer and former coach of the Brisbane Lions in the AFL

References

External links

 Orbost District Website

Towns in Victoria (Australia)
Shire of East Gippsland